Shinzo Takagaki (1893–1977) was a pioneer in judo.

Takagaki brought judo to Australia in 1928, and Africa in 1931, and was considered to be an authority in judo.  He is considered to be the father of judo in Asia as he taught in India, Burma, Afghanistan, Thailand, Malaysia, Java, Sumatra, and Taiwan.  Takagaki also taught judo in Argentina at the invitation of Juan Perón, as well as Brazil, Peru, Mexico and Cuba.

He co-authored a book called The Techniques of Judo.

He attended Nihon University and was considered to be a spy for Japan.

References

Judoka trainers
Japanese male judoka
1893 births
1977 deaths
19th-century Japanese people
20th-century Japanese people